Bates Motel may refer to:

Structures 
 Bates Motel, location in Robert Bloch's novel Psycho
 Bates Motel, attraction in the Universal Studios Hollywood theme park
 Bates Motel, Universal Studios Florida, see list of former Universal Studios Florida attractions

Titled works 
Bates Motel (film) (1987)
Bates Motel (TV series) starring Vera Farmiga and Freddie Highmore (2013–17)

Other
 Bates Motel, musical group, predecessor of Gleaming Spires
Bates Motel (horse) (1979–2004), racehorse

See also